Technologie is the second album released in 2007 by the alternative rock band Black Lab. It consists of several new tracks, remixes of some songs that appeared on the album See the Sun, a song that previously had been released on the soundtrack to Blade: Trinity ("This Blood") and a cover of the theme song to Transformers. The album art is made in the graphical style of the TRS-80 Color Computer, a home computer from the early 1980s.

Track listing
"Bulletproof"
"New Prayer"
"River of Joy"
"Living Too Fast"
"Lonely Boy" (Miss Volatile Remix)
"Hole in My Heart"
"When Worlds Collide"
"Ecstasy" (Switchblade Remix)
"Ghost in the Machine" (vocals by Andy Ellis)
"Remember" (Motorboat Drama Remix)
"A Stone's Throw"
"This Blood"
"Transformers Theme"

2007 albums
Black Lab albums